Histura is a genus of moths in the family Tortricidae.

Species
Histura berylla Razowski & Becker, 2011
Histura bicornigera  Razowski, 1984
Histura boliviana  Razowski, 1984
Histura brunneotypa Razowski & Pelz, 2007
Histura chlorotypa  Razowski & Becker, 1981
Histura cuprata  Meyrick, 1917
Histura doriae  Razowski & Becker, 1981
Histura hirsuta  Walsingham, 1914 
Histura limosa  Meyrick, 1912
Histura luteochlora Razowski & Becker, 2011
Histura perseavora J.W. Brown, 2010
Histura xanthotypa  Razowski & Becker, 1981

References

 , 2005: World Catalogue of Insects volume 5 Tortricidae.
  2010: A new species of Histura Razowski (Lepidoptera: Tortricidae: Polyorthini) from Guatemala attacking avocados (Persea americana) (Lauraceae). Proceedings of the Entomological Society of Washington 112 (1): 10-21.
 , 1981, Acta zoologica cracoviensia 25: 310.
 , 2011: Systematic and faunistic data on Neotropical Tortricidae: Phricanthini, Tortricini, Atteriini, Polyorthini, Chlidanotini (Lepidoptera: Tortricidae). Shilap Revista de Lepidopterologia 39 (154): 161-181.

External links
tortricidae.com

Polyorthini
Tortricidae genera
Taxa named by Józef Razowski